Formula One 2001 may refer to:

 the 2001 season of the Formula One championship,
 F1 2001, a video game developed by EA Sports / Electronic Arts,
 Formula One 2001, a video game developed by Studio 33 and Sony Studio Liverpool.